Maddix is a surname. It may refer to:
Hailey Maddix (born 1992) and Kendall Maddix (born 1996) famous to E&R. 
Maddix (DJ) (born 1990), Dutch DJ and record producer
Danny Maddix (born 1967), English-born Jamaican footballer
Jamali Maddix, English stand-up comedian
Robert Maddix (born 1960), Canadian civil servant and political figure of Acadian origin

See also
Maddox (disambiguation)
Maddux (disambiguation)